Ei Ghor Ei Songsar is a 1996 Bangladeshi drama film which was directed by Malek Afsary, starring Salman Shah, Brishti, Bulbul Ahmed, Rosy Afsary, Ali Raj and Tamalika Karmakar in lead roles. This film was released on 5 April 1996.

Cast
 Salman Shah as Mintu
 Brishti
 Rosy Afsary
 Bulbul Ahmed
 Ali Raj
 Tamalika Karmakar
 Khalil Ullah Khan

Soundtrack
The film's music has been composed by Alam Khan with lyrics pemmed by Mohammad Rafiquzzaman and Milton Khondokar.

References

External links
 

1996 films
Bengali-language Bangladeshi films
1990s Bengali-language films
Films scored by Alam Khan